Hannah Dineen Cotter is a former camogie player, captain of the All Ireland Camogie Championship winning team in 1972, the third in succession for the county. She previously won All Ireland senior medals in 1970 and 1971 and completed Cork's four in a row in 1973, under her married name Hannah Cotter.

Career
She starred for University College Cork in their 1965 Ashbourne Cup success, their first for 14 years, and again for UCC in their unsuccessful Ashbourne Cup final of 1966. It led to a Beamish & Crawford Cork camogie player of the year award in January 1966. In 1970 she featured on the Cork team that won the All Ireland after 41 years and retained her place for the subsequent four in a row and two more finals over the following eight years before retiring in 1978. Her last appearance was in the 1977-78 National League final. She continued to train camogie players at St Leo's convent in Carlow.

References

External links
 Camogie.ie Official Camogie Association Website
 Wikipedia List of Camogie players

Cork camogie players
Living people
Year of birth missing (living people)
UCC camogie players